Bandstone Block is an almost rectangular block of sandstone in eastern Alexander Island, Antarctica. The coast in this vicinity was first seen from the air by Lincoln Ellsworth on November 23, 1935, and roughly mapped from photos obtained on that flight by W.L.G. Joerg. This feature was first surveyed in 1949 by the Falkland Islands Dependencies Survey, who named it because of its conspicuous sedimentary bands.

See also

 Horrocks Block
 Rhea Corner

References

Rock formations on Alexander Island